Manuel Mora Torres (1913-2005) was an Andalusian anarchist, trade unionist and militant.

Biography
Born in Carmona in 1913, he was a member of the CNT. He participated in the Confederal Congress of Zaragoza, in 1936.

After the outbreak of the Spanish Civil War he joined the confederal militias and, later, the Spanish Republican Army. In July 1938, in the face of the Ebro Offensive, Mora was appointed commander of the 16th Division of the XII Army Corps. On July 27 the division crossed the Ebro, participating in the fighting against Villalba de los Arcos.

On August 22, a nationalist attack against the 16th Division positions caused their disbandment, including its commander.  Manuel Mora was unaccounted for several hours, until he reported to the command post of the 124th Mixed Brigade and communicated (falsely) to Juan Modesto that the nationalist advance had already reached the Ebro river. Mora was instantly dismissed and replaced by Sebastián Zamora Medina. 

After the end of the conflict, he went into exile, passing through France and Venezuela - where he arrived in 1946.

Notes

References

Bibliography
 
 
 
 

1913 births
2005 deaths
Spanish military personnel of the Spanish Civil War (Republican faction)
Exiles of the Spanish Civil War in France
Confederación Nacional del Trabajo members
Spanish anarchists